Cosmos bipinnatus, commonly called the garden cosmos or Mexican aster, is a medium-sized flowering herbaceous plant in the daisy family Asteraceae, native to the Americas. The species and its varieties and cultivars are popular as ornamental plants in temperate climate gardens.

Description

Cosmos bipinnatus is considered a half-hardy annual, although plants may reappear via self-sowing for several years. The plant height varies from 2-6 ft to (rarely) 9 ft. The cultivated varieties appear in shades of pink and purple as well as white. The branched stem is usually densely to occasionally occupied by fine, split up, rough trichomes, some specimens are completely hairless. The petiole itself is inconspicuous, winged, 10 (rarely to 15) mm long, sometimes the leaves are almost sessile. 

The partial leaves are linear-filiform to narrow linear with a width of 0.5 to 1 (rarely to 1.7) mm; the tips are pointed, hardened, but not particularly sharp. Its foliage is finely cut into threadlike segments.  When flowering, the plant can become top heavy.  This problem is alleviated when grown in groups, as the bipinnate leaves interlock, and the colony supports itself.

The achenes become blackish, are smooth or short-bristly. Their shape is spindle-like. A pappus is missing or it consists only of two to three awn-like,  large bristles.

Flowers

The very conspicuous cup-shaped inflorescences have a diameter of usually 5 to 7 (rarely 8) cm and contain tongue and tubular flowers, which are surrounded by bracts. They are translucent with many black stripes and a clear edge up to 1 mm wide, sometimes with yellowish or pink pigments, the tip is ciliate. The sprout leaveshave gold-yellow, thread-like tips and protrude between the tubular flowers. The broadened base of these spreader leaves is translucent, provided with a yellow line. During flowering, the plant can sag under its weight. This problem can be solved by grouping the feet together so that the leaves hang together. 

The mostly eight ray florets are pink to violet or white colored, at the base may show noticeable stains caused by anthocyanin. The tongues are reversely ovate shaped, have a length of usually  and a width of usually . The tips are almost dull and have three broad, wavy teeth. Below that, they are greatly rejuvenated.

Range
Garden Cosmos is native to Mexico, Guatemala and Costa Rica. Since it is used as an ornamental plant in many countries and prone to sedimentation, it is an invasive plant in many areas of the world. It has naturalized in scattered locations across North America, South America, the West Indies, Italy, Australia, and Asia, where it is a garden escape (introduced species) and in some habitats becoming a weed.

Cultivars
Cultivars of Cosmos bipinnatus in cultivation today include:
Apollo Series
'Apollo Carmine'  
 'Apollo Pink'  
'Apollo White'  
'Daydream' features a pink inner ring on a white background
Double Click Series  features semidouble to fully double flowers that resemble Japanese anemones (Anemone japonica)
'Double Click Cranberries' 
'Double Click Rose Bonbon'  
'Double Click Snow Puff' 
'Double Click Vari Extra'  
'Rubenza'  
 'Sensation', also known as 'Early Sensation', is a widely available mix of tall varieties
 'Sensation Pinkie'  
Sonata series  
'Velouette' 
 'Versailles', developed for the cut flower trade, are shorter than the species, with heights remaining below three feet
'Versailles Dark Rose' 
'Vesailles Tetra'  
(those marked  have gained the Royal Horticultural Society's Award of Garden Merit).

Cultivation
Growth characteristics of this plant include:
 It prefers a soil pH between 6.0 and 8.5, reflecting its native habitat in the alkaline regions of Central America
 Flowering is best in full sun, although partial shade is tolerated
Excessive rain can cause cultivation problems, due to the delicate nature of the stems. Heavy rain can cause breakage. Cosmos bipinnatus can tolerate heat as long as adequate moisture is provided, however, it does not handle droughts, strong winds or cold temperatures well. Snails, slugs and aphids have a taste for Cosmos bipinnatus. Successfully cultivated plants can mature  x .

Pollinators
The flowers of Cosmos bipinnatus attract birds and butterflies, including the monarch butterfly. It can be part of butterfly gardening and pollinator/honey-bee habitat gardens.

Gallery

References

External links
 Cosmos history and cultivation, Texas A&M University
 Cosmos Festival in Argentina - Press and video
 Jepson Manual Treatment - Jepson Manual, University of California, Cosmos bipinnatus
 United States Department of Agriculture Plants Profile
 Cosmos bipinnatus - Calphotos Photo gallery, University of California

bipinnatus
Flora of Mexico
Garden plants of North America
Butterfly food plants
Annual plants
Plants described in 1791
Taxa named by Antonio José Cavanilles